Jack O'Brien may refer to:

Sports 
 Jack O'Brien (American football) (born 1932), American football player
 Jack O'Brien (catcher) (1860–1910), Major League Baseball player
 Jack O'Brien (cricketer) (1886–1939), New Zealand cricketer
 Jack O'Brien (footballer, born 1887) (1887–1959), Australian rules footballer for Essendon and Fitzroy
 Jack O'Brien (footballer, born 1893) (1893–1934), Australian rules footballer for South Melbourne
 Jack O'Brien (footballer, born 1898) (1898–1966), Australian rules footballer for Essendon and Footscray
 Jack O'Brien (footballer, born 1906) (1906–1970), Australian rules footballer for South Melbourne and Hawthorn
 Jack O'Brien (outfielder) (1873–1933), American baseball player
 Jack O'Brien (wrestler) (1910–1982), American-born Mexican professional wrestler
 Philadelphia Jack O'Brien (1878–1942), American boxer, former light heavyweight boxing champion of the world
 Young Jack O'Brien (1894–?), lightweight boxer from Pennsylvania

Others 
 Jack O'Brien (director) (born 1939), American theatre director and producer
 Jack O'Brien (jazz pianist) (1903–1982), big band pianist and songwriter
 John B. O'Brien (known as Jack, 1884-1936), American actor and film director
 Jack O'Brien (editor) (born 1980), American editor

See also
 John O'Brien (disambiguation)
 Jack O'Brian (1914–2000), journalist